The Edison Academy Magnet School (formerly known as the Middlesex County Academy for Science, Mathematics and Engineering Technologies) is a four-year career academy and college preparatory magnet public high school located on the campus of the Middlesex County College in Edison, in Middlesex County, New Jersey, United States, serving students in ninth through twelfth grades as part of the Middlesex County Magnet Schools. The school serves students from all over Middlesex County who are eligible to apply to their program of choice while in eighth grade.

As of the 2021–22 school year, the school had an enrollment of 172 students and 11.5 classroom teachers (on an FTE basis), for a student–teacher ratio of 15.0:1. There were 5 students (2.9% of enrollment) eligible for free lunch and 1 (0.6% of students) eligible for reduced-cost lunch.

Awards, recognition and rankings
In September 2013, the academy was one of 15 schools in New Jersey to be recognized by the United States Department of Education as part of the National Blue Ribbon Schools Program, an award called the "most prestigious honor in the United States' education system" and which Education Secretary Arne Duncan described as schools that "represent examples of educational excellence".

Schooldigger.com ranked the school as one of 16 schools tied for first out of 381 public high schools statewide in its 2011 rankings (unchanged from the 2010 ranking) which were based on the combined percentage of students classified as proficient or above proficient on the language arts literacy (100.0%) and mathematics (100.0%) components of the High School Proficiency Assessment (HSPA).

In its listing of "America's Best High Schools 2016", the school was ranked 10th out of 500 best high schools in the country; it was ranked third among all high schools in New Jersey.

The Academy offers students the opportunity to apply and participate in the National Honor Society and Spanish National Honor Society.

History
Founded in 2000, the Academy inaugurated a freshman class of 40 students from all over the county and had its first graduating class in 2004. During the 2010–2011 school year, The Academy underwent the process of incorporating its first AP class into the curriculum, AP English Literature and Composition, running concurrent to the existing senior English class, British Literature. The first exam was administered that year, and the first full year curriculum will begin for the senior class of 2012. The Academy accepts 42 freshman students each year through a competitive admissions process.

Education
The major subjects of studies for four years are the following: 
English: World Literature Honors, American Literature I/II Honors, and AP English Literature and Composition
Mathematics: Geometry Honors, Algebra II Honors, Precalculus Honors, AP Calculus AB, and AP Calculus BC
Lab Sciences: Biology Honors, Chemistry Honors, Physics Honors, and AP Environmental Science
Social Science: World History Honors, and US History I/II Honors
Health and Physical Education: Phys. Ed. classes are held in the Middlesex County College Physical Education Center. As per New Jersey Department of Education graduation requirements, each student must take health and physical education classes each year.
World Language: Spanish I - II Honors (Mandatory), Spanish III Honors, AP Spanish Language and Culture (Optional)
Engineering Major: During their freshman year, each student selects whether to study Electronic and Computer Engineering or Civil and Mechanical Engineering for the rest of their high school years.

In order to fulfill NJ DOE requirements, financial literacy is incorporated in the engineering courses, while visual and performing arts is part of the AP English Literature and Composition curriculum.

Engineering majors
CMET Engineering (Civil/Mechanical)

The Academy uses a hands-on approach to teaching students the skills that Civil and Mechanical engineers use in the workforce. Students design and create useful projects in addition to learning the basics of bridge design, beam design, and truss analysis.

Previous projects include building a  bridge out of PVC, foam, and wood, a fully working hovercraft (which is currently being redesigned), and designing a name display system for the students' desks. All projects in the Civil/Mechanical class are fully documented and are written up in presentation quality binders.

ECET Engineering (Electronic/Computer)

The Electronic Engineering Curriculum starts with procedural programming in C++ and basic analog and digital circuits and goes into C++ with object-oriented programming, the PIC microcontroller, Finite State Machines, and communication systems. The ECET program has a fully equipped electrical lab, which is used heavily throughout the four-year program.

Some of the projects in the ECET lab include a digital thermometer with Celsius and Fahrenheit, a circuit to display the user's birthday, and numerous C++ programs including basic game programming such as Space Invaders and Pong.  With instructor permission, some students are allowed to use other languages and/or libraries such as QT and The Unreal Engine.

Exploratory program

In order to expose students to both engineering tracks, every student goes through a 45-day program in each of the two engineering tracks. During this exploratory program, the students complete hands-on experiments and are taught to think in innovative ways. Lectures include introductions to new and innovative paradigms and the consequences of paradigm shifts. A favorite of the students is the egg drop experiment, in which students must get an egg from the second floor of the building to a landing zone on the first floor without the egg breaking. The electrical engineering exploratory program includes boolean logic, binary arithmetic, and culminates in a project where students use a programmable logic device to display their birthday on a seven-segment display.

After the 90-day period, students write on a piece of paper which engineering program they would want to be in for the remaining 3½ years of high school. The administration and engineering teachers attempt to put the students in the classes they choose, while not violating any building or fire codes for occupancy.

Senior project
One of the most prominent features of the Academy is senior project. After three years of engineering education, the fourth year is devoted to a free-form project in which students must learn to manage from start to finish a full-scale engineering project. Students must either invent a new product, or add value to an existing product. Before the project starts, students complete a full patent search, and must pick a project which is different from any existing products. Students are required to give regular progress reports and must give between five and ten presentations per quarter, including seminar presentations on topics related to their projects. Accurate Gantt chart-type progress plans must be maintained alongside a full patent-ready documentation folder including an engineering notebook which must be dated, signed, and witnessed.

Electronic projects
Projects in the electronic engineering track must contain both a hardware and a software portion of the project. Typically, this is satisfied using a PIC microcontroller or other similar device programmed in assembly code.

Projects in the Electronic track have included a hydrogen fuel cell powered R/C car, an automatic door lock, a self-regulating awning, a chair with built-in rumble/surround sound, automatic coupon calculator, a USB Morse Code keyboard, an automatically adjusting light dimmer, a robotic spider, a room-mapping device, a season pass system for amusement parks similar to E-ZPass, a synthesized audio sequencer, and a wireless parking meter system.

Civil/Mechanical projects
Projects in the Civil/Mechanical track must be approved by the instructor and generally contain no complex electronics. As such, projects are limited to things which can be built in the classroom using the available tooling.

Projects in the C/M track have included a hand-operated trash compactor, a new type of whiteboard eraser, a self-cleaning rake, a sorter machine, and a system for removing excess carbon monoxide from car exhaust using hemoglobin.

Electives
Unlike other high schools, students at the Academy can only take electives in their Junior and Senior years. The electives taught in-house include Spanish III, AP Spanish Language, Creative Writing I/II, Public Speaking and Rhetoric I/II, Technical Writing I/II, Discrete Math, Linear Algebra, and AP Statistics.

Students are also encouraged to take classes at Middlesex County College which fit into the allotted time slot. This enables students to take college classes for credit, many of which apply to both high school and college education. Some students also test out of required classes (e.g. AP Calculus BC) and may take advanced courses (e.g. real analysis, multi-variable calculus) through accredited universities.

Athletics
The Edison Academy Eagles compete in the Greater Middlesex Conference, which include public and private high schools located in the greater Middlesex County area and operates under the supervision of the New Jersey State Interscholastic Athletic Association (NJSIAA). With 119 students in grades 10-12, the school was classified by the NJSIAA for the 2019–20 school year as Group I for most athletic competition purposes, which included schools with an enrollment of 75 to 476 students in that grade range.

The Academy introduced its first varsity and junior varsity team in the sport of soccer in the 2003 season. The Eagles finished the season in second place in the Gold Division of the Greater Middlesex Conference with a 7-2-1 record in the 2009 regular season. They have been led by Coach Kathy McNulty since their inaugural year and have an overall record of 55-54-2 (.495 winning percentage) and 45-23-2 (.643) in division record since the Eagles joined the Gold Division in 2004. After finishing 2nd in the GMC Gold Division for the previous three years, the Academy Eagles for the 2007 Fall season were the Greater Middlesex County Conference Gold Division Champions.

Due to its limited sports resources, the academy allows its students to participate in sports for their hometown high schools independently. Such students have competed in basketball, football, soccer (prior to the establishment of the team), field hockey, bowling, swimming, and fencing, among others.

Admissions
All prospective students must pass a rigorous admissions procedure, including a three-hour standardized test consisting of math and language arts sections and an interview. Prospective students are then ranked, and the highest qualifying score from each municipality is given the slot reserved for that community (each municipality in the Middlesex County has a single slot reserved for it, provided that it has at least one student with a qualifying score). The remaining students are then ranked in order, and the highest scoring students are selected. There are 42 slots available in each incoming freshman class, resulting in an average 9% acceptance rate.

Administration
The principal is John P. Jeffries. His administration team includes the assistant principal.

References

External links
Official Middlesex County Academy Website
WhyAcademy: Alumni Perspectives
Middlesex County Vocational and Technical Schools

National Center for Educational Statistics data for the Middlesex County Vocational and Technical Schools

2000 establishments in New Jersey
Edison, New Jersey
Educational institutions established in 2000
Magnet schools in New Jersey
Public high schools in Middlesex County, New Jersey